
Year 229 (CCXXIX) was a common year starting on Thursday (link will display the full calendar) of the Julian calendar. At the time, it was known as the Year of the Consulship of Severus and Cassius (or, less frequently, year 982 Ab urbe condita). The denomination 229 for this year has been used since the early medieval period, when the Anno Domini calendar era became the prevalent method in Europe for naming years.

Events 
 By place 

 Roman Empire 
 Emperor Alexander Severus and Dio Cassius are joint Consuls.

 China 
 February–May – Battle of Jianwei: The state of Shu Han is victorious over the state of Cao Wei.
 June 23 – Chinese warlord Sun Quan formally declares himself emperor of the Eastern Wu state. The city of Jianye (modern Nanjing) is founded as the capital of Eastern Wu. The independent kingdoms in Cambodia and Laos become Eastern Wu vassals.
 Eastern Wu merchants reach Vietnam; ocean transport is improved to such an extent, that sea journeys are made to Manchuria and the island of Taiwan.

 By topic 

 Art and Science 
 Ammonius Saccas renews Greek philosophy by creating Neoplatonism.

Deaths 
 Cao Li, Chinese prince of the Cao Wei state (b. 208)
 Cao Yong, Chinese prince of the Cao Wei state
 Zhao Yun, Chinese general of the Shu Han state

References